Ağamçağam is a village in the Otlukbeli District, Erzincan Province, Turkey. It had a population of 105 in 2021.

The hamlet of Ağamçağamkomu is attached to the village.

References 

Villages in Otlukbeli District